A Sparse graph code is a code which is represented by a sparse graph.

Any linear code can be represented as a graph, where there are two sets of nodes - a set representing the transmitted bits and another set representing the constraints that the transmitted bits have to satisfy. The state of the art classical error-correcting codes are based on sparse graphs, achieving close to the Shannon limit. The archetypal sparse-graph codes are Gallager's low-density parity-check codes.

External links 
 The on-line textbook: Information Theory, Inference, and Learning Algorithms, by David J.C. MacKay, discusses sparse-graph codes in Chapters 47–50.
Encyclopedia of Sparse Graph Codes
 Iterative Error Correction: Turbo, Low-Density Parity-Check, and Repeat-Cccumulate Codes

Matrix theory
Error detection and correction